Derrin Kennedy Ebanks (born 16 December 1988) is a Caymanian footballer who plays as a midfielder. He represented the Cayman Islands during World Cup qualifying matches in 2011.

References

Association football midfielders
Living people
1988 births
Caymanian footballers
Cayman Islands international footballers
Elite SC players